Natatolana sinuosa is a species of crustacean in the family Cirolanidae, and was first described by Stephen John Keable in 2006. The species epithet, sinuosa, describes the "sinuate posterior margins of the coxae".

It is an intertidal, benthic species, living at depths of about 0-30 m, in waters off South Australia, Victoria, Tasmania and New South Wales. It is sexually dimorphic.

References

External links
Natatolana sinuosa occurrence data from GBIF

Cymothoida
Crustaceans of Australia
Crustaceans described in 2006
Taxa named by Stephen John Keable